Many notable people were either born in New York City or adopted it as their home.

People from New York City

0-50
50 Cent (Curtis Jackson, born 1975) – businessman and rapper
6ix9ine (Daniel Hernandez, born 1996) – rapper
22Gz (Jeffrey Mark Alexander, born 1997) – Brooklyn drill rapper

A 

Aaliyah (Aaliyah Haughton, 1979–2001) – singer, actress and model
Zaid Abdul-Aziz (born 1946) – professional basketball player
Kareem Abdul-Jabbar (born 1947) – basketball player
George Abernethy (1807–1877) – first provisional Governor of Oregon
Cecile Abish (born 1930) – sculptor
Oday Aboushi (born 1991) – football player
Ray Abruzzo (born 1954) – actor
Bella Abzug (1920–1998) – Congressional representative
Garnett Adrain (1815–1878) – member of the United States House of Representatives from New Jersey
Cornelius Rea Agnew (1830–1888) – ophthalmologist
Eliza Agnew (1807–1883) – Presbyterian missionary
Christina Aguilera (born 1980) – singer
Danny Aiello (1933–2019) – actor
AJR (born 1990, 1994, and 1997) – indie pop trio and multi-instrumentalists
Marv Albert (born 1941) – sports announcer
Eva Allen Alberti (1856-1938) – dramatics teacher
Alan Alda (born 1936) – actor
Ira Aldridge (1805–1867) – stage actor
William Alexander, Lord Stirling (1726–1783) – major general in the American Revolutionary War
Nancy Allen (born 1950) – actress
Woody Allen (born 1935) – film director, actor and screenwriter
Vincent Alo (1904–2001) – mobster
Rafer Alston (born 1976) – basketball player
Lee J. Ames (1921–2011) – illustrator and writer; known for the Draw 50... learn-to-draw books
Trey Anastasio (born 1964) – rock musician, member of the band, Phish
Kenny Anderson – (born 1970) professional basketball player
Natalie and Nadiya Anderson (born 1986) – twins, television personalities; contestants on The Amazing Race and winner of Survivor: San Juan del Sur'
Charles Anthon (1797–1867) – classical scholar
Carmelo Anthony (born 1984) – basketball player
Marc Anthony (born 1968)  – singer, actor
Judd Apatow (born 1967)  – producer, director, comedian, actor and screenwriter
Fiona Apple (born 1977)  – singer-songwriter
Jacob Appel – (born 1973), short story writer, bioethicist, born in New York City
Diane Arbus (1923–1971) – photographer
Nate Archibald (born 1948) – professional basketball player
Edward Arnold (1890–1956) – actor
Rosanna Arquette (born 1959) – actress
Kenneth J. Arrow (1921–2017) – economist; recipient, 1972 Nobel Memorial Prize in Economic Sciences
Beatrice Arthur (1922–2009) – actress
 Marilyn Aschner (born 1948) – professional tennis player
William H. Aspinwall(1807–1875) – railroad promoter
John Jacob Astor III (1822–1890) – businessman, member of the Astor family
John Jacob Astor VI (1912–1992) – socialite and businessman, member of the Astor family
Vincent Astor (1891–1959) – businessman and philanthropist, member of the Astor family
William Backhouse Astor, Sr. (1792–1875) – businessman, member of the Astor family
William Backhouse Astor Jr. (1829–1892) – businessman, racehorse owner, and yachtsman, member of the Astor family
René Auberjonois (1940–2019) – actor
Jake T. Austin (born 1994)  – actor, model, and writer
Awkwafina (Nora Lum, born 1988) – rapper and actress
AZ (born 1972)  – rapper, former member of the rap group The Firm
Hank Azaria (born 1964) – actor

 B 

Edwin Burr Babbitt – actor
Morena Baccarin (born 1979) – Brazilian-born actress
Johnny Bach (1924–2016) – professional basketball player and coach
Emma Bailey (1910–1999) – auctioneer and author
William Bliss Baker – landscape artist
Azealia Banks (born 1991) – rapper, singer-songwriter, and actress
Lloyd Banks (born 1982) – rapper
Joseph Barbera (1911–2006) – animator, producer, director, MGM and co-founder of Hanna-Barbera
 Moses Michael Levi Barrow (born Jamal Michael Barrow; 1978), better known by his stage name Shyne, Belizean rapper and politician
Bryan Bautista – Dominican-American musician, singer, and contestant from NBC's The Voice season 10
Earl Beecham – football player
Francesca Beghe
Harry Belafonte (born 1927) – singer-songwriter, activist, actor
Bo Belinsky (1936–2001) – Major League Baseball player
Aisha Tandiwe Bell – mixed media artist
Tony Bennett – jazz singer and musician
Lillie Berg (1845–1896) – musician, musical educator
Moe Berg (1902–1972) – Major League Baseball player and spy
Milton Berle – comedian
Paul Berlenbach (1901–1985) – light heavyweight boxing champion, 1925–1926
Dellin Betances – Major League Baseball pitcher
Acid Betty – drag queen
Mario Biaggi (1917–2015) – decorated policeman and US Congressman
Bipolar Explorer – dreampop band
Raymond Ward Bissell – art historian
Joan Blondell – actress
Humphrey Bogart (1899–1957) – actor

A Boogie wit da Hoodie (born 1995) – rapper
William T. Bonniwell Jr. – Wisconsin and Minnesota politician
Joseph Borelli – politician, conservative commentator
Francis Bouillon – National Hockey League defenseman playing for the Nashville Predators
Kate Parker Scott Boyd (1836–1922) – artist, journalist, temperance worker
William Boylan (1869–1940) – first President of Brooklyn College
Barbara Boxer (born 1940) – U.S. Senator from California
James J. Braddock – boxer (aka "Cinderella Man")
Hermann Braun (1918–1945) – actor
Abigail Breslin – actress and musician
Jimmy Breslin – columnist
Spencer Breslin (born 1992) – actor and musician
Richard Bright (1937–2006) – actor
Eben Britton – football player
Matthew Broderick – actor and singer
Action Bronson – rapper
Mel Brooks (born 1926) – film director, screenwriter, actor
Helen Gilman Noyes Brown – philanthropist
Julia Brown – madam and prostitute
Larry Brown – basketball player and coach
 Quincy Brown – actor
Tarell Brown (born 1985) – football player
Andrew Bryson (1822–1892) – United States Navy rear admiral
William F. Buckley Jr. – author and conservative commentator
Sidney Jonas Budnick – abstract artist
Daniel Bukantz (1917–2008) – four-time Olympic fencer
Robert John Burke (born 1960) – actor and firefighter
George Burns (1896–1996)  – comedian
Steve Buscemi – actor
Benjamin Busch – U.S. Marine Lieutenant Colonel and actor
Barbara Bush (1925–2018)  – wife of George H. W. Bush
Gene Byrnes – cartoonist
Michelle Borth – actress
Joey Badass – rapper

 C 

 Christopher Latore Wallace (The Notorious BIG) – rapper
James Caan (1940–2022) – actor
Adolph Caesar (1933–1986) – actor
Leslie Cagan (born 1947) – activist and writer
James Cagney (1899–1986) – actor
Eddie Cahill (born 1978) – actor
Edward L. Cahn (1899–1963) film director known for the Our Gang comedies
Sarth Calhoun – electronic musician
Joseph A. Califano (born 1931) – Secretary of Health, Education, and Welfare
Maria Callas (1923–1977) – Greek-American opera singer
Cher Calvin (born 1974) – journalist
Richard Camacho – singer, musician, member of Latin music band CNCO, Dominican-origin
Christian Camargo – actor
Schuyler V. Cammann (1912–1991) – anthropologist
Chris Canty – football player
Jeimer Candelario – baseball player 
William Mebarak Chadid (1931–present) – father of Shakira
Al Capone (1899–1947) – Prohibition gangster, boss of Chicago Outfit
Mae Capone (1897–1986) – wife of Al Capone
Capone (born 1976) – rapper
Francis Capra (born 1983) – actor
Jennifer Capriati (born 1976) – tennis player
Nestor Carbonell (born 1967) – actor
Irene Cara (born 1959) – singer-songwriter, dancer, actress
Cardi B (born 1992) – rapper
Benjamin Cardozo (1870–1938) – Associate Justice of the U.S. Supreme Court
Michael A. Cardozo – Corporation Counsel
Hugh Carey (1919–2011) – Governor of New York
Timothy Carey (1929–1994) – actor
George Carlin (1937–2008) – comedian
Alan Carney (1909–1973) – actor, comedian
Caleb Carr (born 1955) – novelist, military historian
Eric Carr (1950–1991) – rock musician, songwriter
John Carradine (1906–1988) – actor
Julian Casablancas (born 1978) – lead singer of rock band The Strokes; musician
Colin Cassady (born 1986) – professional wrestler working for AEW
John Cassavetes (1929–1989) – actor
DJ Cassidy (born 1981) – DJ, record producer, MC
Richard S. Castellano (1933–1988) – actor
Luis Castillo – football player
Vinnie Caruana (born 1979) – musician, singer
Phoebe Cates (born 1963)actress
Jose Ceballos – trade unionist, political campaign manager
Kai Cenat (born 2001) – YouTuber
Bennett Cerf (1898–1971) – publisher, TV personality
 Stanley Chais (1926–2010) – investment advisor in the Madoff investment scandal
Timothée Chalamet – actor
Jeff Chandler (1918–1961) – actor
Frank Chanfrau (1824–1884) – actor
James S. C. Chao – Chinese-American entrepreneur, philanthropist
Harry Chapin (1942–1981) – singer-songwriter
Roz Chast – cartoonist
Paddy Chayefsky – author
Maury Chaykin – actor
Julie Chen – television personality
Edmund A. Chester – executive at CBS
Jennie Jerome Churchill (1854–1921) – mother of Winston Churchill
Hansol Vernon Chwe – singer (member of pop group Seventeen)
Peter Cincotti – singer-songwriter
Andre Cisco – NFL safety for the Jacksonville Jaguars
Robert Clohessy (born 1957) – actor
Evan Cole – CEO of H.D. Buttercup
Schuyler Colfax Jr. (1823–1885) – former Vice President of the United States
Margaret Colin – actress
Willie Colón – salsa musician, social activist
Jennifer Connelly (born 1970) – actress
Irv Constantine – football player
 Evan Conti (born 1993) – American-Israeli basketball player and coach 
Hugh E. Conway – labor economist
Terence Cooke (1921–1983) – seventh archbishop of New York
Anderson Cooper – television journalist
George H. Cooper (1821–1891) – United States Navy rear admiral
Shaun Cooper (born 1980) – rock musician, bassist
Lillian Copeland (1904–1964) - Olympic discus champion; set world records in discus, javelin, and shot put
Francis Ford Coppola (born 1939) – film director, screenwriter, and producer
Karla Cornejo Villavicencio – writer
Alexandria Ocasio-Cortez – U.S. Representative
William R. Cosentini – mechanical engineer and founder of Cosentini Associates
Ann Coulter – conservative commentator, writer
Freddie Crawford – basketball player
Peter Criss (born 1945) – rock musician, songwriter
Billy Crystal (born 1948) – comedian, actor, director
George Cukor (1899–1983) – film director
Kieran Culkin (born 1982) – actor
Kit Culkin (born 1944) – actor
Macaulay Culkin (born 1980) – actor
Rory Culkin (born 1989) – actor
Jermaine Cunningham (born 1988) – football player
Andrew Cuomo (born 1957) – Governor of New York
Mario Cuomo (1932–2015) – Governor of New York
Quentin Curry (born 1972) – landscape painter
Valerie Curtin (born 1945) – actress, screenwriter
Tony Curtis (1925–2010) – actor

 D 

Alexandra Daddario – actress
Matthew Daddario – actor
Chester Dale – banker
Charles Patrick Daly – judge
Robert Dalva – filmmaker, editor
Al D'Amato – politician
Claire Danes – actress
Rodney Dangerfield – comedian
Lloyd Daniels – basketball player
Ron Dante – singer-songwriter, record producer
Tony Danza – actor
Bobby Darin – singer-songwriter, entertainer, actor
Candy Darling  actress and Warhol superstar
Jim David – comedian, actor, playwright
Larry David – actor, writer, comedian, producer
Pete Davidson – actor, comedian
Marion Davies – actress
Al "Bummy" Davis – boxer
Sammy Davis Jr. (1925–1990) – singer, entertainer
Dawin (full name Dawin Polanco) – hip hop-R&B singer, musician, record producer
Rosario Dawson – actress
Clarence Day (1874–1935) – author and humorist
Charlie Day – actor
Dorothy Day – Catholic social activist
Hal de Becker – dancer and dance writer
Bill de Blasio – Mayor of New York City
Robert De Niro – actor
Éamon de Valera – Taoiseach (prime minister) and President of Ireland
Philip DeFranco – YouTuber and video blogger
Lana Del Rey model, singer-songwriter
Samuel R. Delany – author and critic
Don DeLillo – author
Aaron T. Demarest – carriage manufacturer
Travis Demeritte – MLB player
Derek Dennis – football player
Jerry Denny Major League Baseball player
Desiigner – rapper
Willy DeVille (1950–2009) singer
Kevin Devine – musician, songwriter
Neil Diamond – singer, composer
Mobb Deep – rappers
John DiBartolomeo (born 1991) – American-Israeli basketball player in the Israeli Basketball Premier League
Vin Diesel – actor
Meg Donnelly – actress, singer, dancer
Vincent D'Onofrio – actor
 Shaun Donovan (born 1966) – former US Secretary of Housing and Urban Development and Director of the Office of Management and Budget, candidate in the 2021 New York City Democratic mayoral primary
Jim Dooley – composer
 Irvin Dorfman (1924–2006) – tennis player
Phoebe Doty – prostitute and madam
Amanda Minnie Douglas (1831–1916) – writer
Kirk Douglas – actor
Robert Downey Jr. – actor, producer, singer
Ervin Drake – composer, producer, writer, musician
Fran Drescher – actor
Julia Louis-Dreyfus – actress
Richard Dreyfuss – actor
Eric Drooker artist, illustrator
Jim Drucker (born 1952/1953) – former Commissioner of the Continental Basketball Association, former Commissioner of the Arena Football League, and founder of NewKadia Comics
David Duchovny – actor
Patty Duke (1946–2016) – actress, activist for mental-health issues
Lena Dunham – actress, screenwriter, producer, director
Joseph Dunninger – mentalist
 Bryant Dunston (born 1986) – American-Armenian basketball player
Richard Dupont – artist
Jimmy Durante (1893–1980) – actor and pianist
Paul Dano (born 1984) – actor
Jakob Dylan (born 1969) – singer
Griffin Dunne (born 1955) – film producer

 E 

Dominique Easley (born 1992) – football player
Gertrude Ederle (1905–2003) – swimmer
Eddie Egan (1930–1995)  – police detective
Gladys Egan (1900–1985) – child actress
Ned Eisenberg (1957–2022) – actor
Jesse Eisenberg (born 1983) – actor
Billy Eichner (born 1978) – actor
Ansel Elgort (born 1994) – actor, singer, dancer, DJ
Lapo Elkann (born 1977) – chief executive officer, Fiat
Bill Elko (born 1959) – football player
Margaret Dye Ellis (1845–1925) – social reformer, lobbyist 
Albert Elsen (1927–1995) – art historian
Etika (1990–2019) – YouTuber, streamer
Mario Elie (born 1963) – basketball player
Duke Ellington (1899–1974) – jazz pianist
Abby Elliott (born 1987) – actress
Nora Ephron (1941–2012) – director, screenwriter, author
Omar Epps (born 1973) – actor
 Theo Epstein (born 1973) – formerly the youngest general manager in MLB, currently President of Baseball Operations for the Chicago Cubs
Eru (born 1983) – singer

 F 

Peter Facinelliactor
Douglas Fairbanks Jr. – actor
Edie Falco – actress
Jonah Falconactor and writer; achieved fame in early 2000s for his penis size 
Jimmy Falloncomedian
Doug E. Fresh – musician
Peter Falkactor
Tali Farhadian – former federal prosecutor and current candidate for New York County District Attorney
Louis Farrakhan – leader of the Nation of Islam
Perry Farrell – musician
Alice Faye – actress
Charles Fazzino – pop artist
 Harry Feldman (1919–1962) – Major League Baseball pitcher
Jack Feldman – lyricist
Morton Feldman – composer
Julissa Ferreras – New York City Council Member, Finance Committee chair
Richard Feynman theoretical physicist; recipient 1965 Nobel Prize in Physics
Barbie Ferreira – actress (Euphoria)
Harvey Fierstein – actor and playwright
Hamilton Fish – Governor of New York and U.S. Secretary of State
Mickey Fisher (1904/05–1963) – basketball coach
Herbert Flam (1928–1980) – tennis player
Bobby Flay – chef
Waka Flocka Flame – rapper
Jeffrey Flier – Dean of Harvard Medical School
Kay Flock – rapper
Jane Fonda – actress
Peter Fonda – actor
Hector Fonseca – DJ
Malcolm Forbes – publisher
Davy Force – major league baseball player
Whitey Ford – pitcher for the New York Yankees
 Adam Fox (born 1998) – professional ice hockey defenseman for the New York Rangers of the National Hockey League
Anthony Franciosa – actor
David Frankel – film director
Al Franken – comedian and radio host, U.S. Senator from Minnesota
Michael Freeman – inventor, entrepreneur, author, and business consultant
Ace Frehleyguitarist
Milton Friedman – economist
Eric Fromm – tennis player
John Frusciante – musician, artist

 G 

Luis García – baseball player
Gus Gardella – football player
Eliza Ann Gardner – Abolitionist 
Art Garfunkel – singer-songwriter, actor
Lou Gehrig – baseball player
Sarah Michelle Gellar – actress
Natalie Gelman – singer/songwriter
Richard Genelle actor
George Gershwin – composer
Ira Gershwin – lyricist
Tiffany Giardinasinger-songwriter
Mel Gibson – American-born Australian/Irish actor and director
Marie George – actress and singer
Vitas Gerulaitis (1954-1994)  – tennis player
Ruth Bader Ginsburg – Associate Justice of U.S. Supreme Court
Rabbi Issamar Ginzberg – business strategist, rabbi, motivational speaker
The GoStation – indie rock group
Rudolph Giuliani – former Mayor of New York City
Charles V. Glasco – New York City Police Sergeant, most well known for his efforts to rescue John William Warde in 1938
Jackie Gleason – comedian, actor
James Gleason – actor
Marco Glorious (born 1984) –  television personality, actor, model, singer, and event host
 Joel Glucksman (born 1949) – Olympic fencer
Whoopi Goldberg – comedian, actress, TV personality
William Goldberg – diamond dealer
Daniel S. Goldin – NASA director
 Danielle Goldstein (born 1985) – American-Israeli show jumper
 Leon M. Goldstein (died 1999) – President of Kingsborough Community College, and acting Chancellor of the City University of New York
Ben Goldwasser member of the psychedelic-rock band MGMT
Minetta Good – painter and printmaker 
Richard Goode – classical pianist
Cuba Gooding Jr. – actor 
Cuba Gooding Sr. – singer
Jared Gordon – mixed martial artist
Joan Gould – author and journalist
Doris Kearns Goodwin – author
Leo Gorcey – film actor and comedian, leader of the Dead End Kids, East Side Kids, and Bowery Boys in several movies
Robert A. Gorman (born 1937) – law professor at the University of Pennsylvania Law School
Eydie Gorme – singer
Victor Gotbaum – labor leader
Gilbert Gottfried (1955-2022)  – comedian and actor 
Elliott Gould – actor
David C. Gowdey – politician
Topher Grace – actor
Sean Grande – television and radio sportscaster
Amata Grassi – classical dancer, and swimmer
Rocky Graziano (born Thomas Rocco Barbella) – boxer
Benny Green  – pianist
Hank Greenberg – Hall of Fame baseball player
Alan Greenspan – economist, former Federal Reserve chairman
Sheila Greenwald – author
Adrian Grenier – actor
Bill Griffith – cartoonist (Zippy)
Melanie Griffith – actress
Alfred Grossman – writer and novelist
Bob Guccione – publisher
Peggy Guggenheim – art collector
Rajat Gupta (born 1948) – CEO of McKinsey & Company convicted of insider trading
 Jim Gurfein (born 1961) – tennis player
Steve Guttenberg – actor
Maggie Gyllenhaal – actress
Joe Gatto – comedian
Milton H. Greene – fashion and celebrity photographer, film and television producer
Mamie Gummer – actress

 H 

Adelaide Hall – jazz singer, Broadway star, actress

Huntz Hall – comedian, actor; co-starred in several Dead End Kids, East Side Kids and Bowery Boys movies
 Jimmy Hall (born 1994) - basketball player in the Israeli National League.
Thomas Hall (1834–1911) – mechanic, inventor, patent attorney. Invented portable typewriter.
Mortimer Halpern – Broadway stage manager
Eddy Hamel (1902–1943) – Jewish-American soccer player for Dutch club AFC Ajax who was killed by the Nazis in Auschwitz concentration camp
Pete Hamill – journalist
Marvin Hamlisch – composer
Armand Hammer – industrialist and philanthropist
Oscar Hammerstein II – composer
Han Terra – polymath
Frank Hankinson – major league baseball player
Sean Hannity – television host, author, conservative political commentator
Nelson Harding (1879–1944) – editorial cartoonist
Edward W. Hardy (born 1992) – composer, musician and producer
Donald J. Harlin – Chief of Chaplains of the U.S. Air Force
Lynn Harrell – cellist
W. Averell Harriman – diplomat and Governor of New York
Zelda Harris – actress
Maurice Harkless – NBA player
Anne Hathaway – actress
Marcia Haufrecht – actor, director, playwright
Curt Hawkins – WWE wrestler
Patrick Joseph Hayes (1867–1938) – fifth archbishop of New York
Susan Hayward (1917–1975) – actress
Rita Hayworth – actress
Anthony Hecht – poet
Ladislav Hecht (1909–2004) – Czechoslovak-American tennis player 
Carol Heiss – Olympic figure skater (silver 1956, gold 1960)
Joseph Heller – author
Alvin Hellerstein (born 1933) – U.S. federal judge
Lance Henriksen – actor
Brian Henson – puppeteer, director, producer
Bernard Herrmann (1911–1975) – composer
Elinore Morehouse Herrick (1895−1964) – labor–relations specialist
Susan Hendl (1947–2020) – ballet dancer and répétiteurRobert Hess (1935–2014) – sculptor, art educator
Peter Cooper Hewitt (1861–1921) – inventor
William Hickey – actor
Logan Hicks – artist
Hildegarde – cabaret singer
Paris Hilton socialite, actress
Gregory Hines – dancer and actor
Judd Hirsch (born 1935) – actor
Camomile Hixon (born 1970) – visual artist
William E. Hoehle – member of the Wisconsin State Assembly
Eric Holtz (born 1965) – Head Coach of the Israel National Baseball Team
Megan Hollingshead (born 1968) – actress, singer, broadway star
Shaheen Holloway (born 1976) – basketball coach and former player, current head coach of the St. Peter's Peacocks
Lena Horne (1917–2010) – singer
Edward Everett Horton – actor
Curly Howard actor of comedy team The Three Stooges
Moe Howard actor of comedy team The Three Stooges
Shemp Howard actor of comedy team The Three Stooges
Steny Hoyer (born 1939) – "U.S Representative from Maryland's 5th district, 1981–Present"
Tina Huang actress
Jon Huertas – actor
Richard Hunt – puppeteer and television director
Tab Hunter (1931–2018) – actor
Cornelia Collins Hussey (1827–1902) – philanthropist, writer 
Barbara Hutton (1912–1979) – socialite dubbed "Poor Little Rich Girl"

 I 

Scott Ian – guitarist for Anthrax
Carl Icahn – financier and a special advisor during the Trump administration
Washington Irving – author
John Isaac – photographer

 J 

Wolfman Jack (also known as Robert Weston Smith; 1938–1995) – radio personality
Jane Jacobs (1916–2006) – economist, urban theorist, activist
Ken Jacobs (born 1933) – artist and filmmaker
Jack Jersawitz (born 1934) Marxist Activist and Television Host
Marc Jacobs (born 1963) – fashion designer
Henry James (1843–1916) – writer
William James (1842–1910) – philosopher and psychologist
Jaiquawn Jarrett (born 1989) – football player
John Jay (1745–1829) – diplomat, jurist (including Chief Justice of the United States) and politician (including Governor of New York)
Jay-Z (born 1969) – businessperson and rapper
Karine Jean-Pierre – political campaign organizer
Derek Jeter – former baseball player
Charles Jenkins (born 1989)basketball player
Max Jenkins (born 1985)actor and writer
Ron Jeremy (born 1953)pornographic actor, filmmaker, and comedian
Ty Jerome (born 1997) – professional basketball player
Jessi (born 1988) – rapper
Jipsta (John Patrick Masterson; born 1974)rapper
MC Jin (born 1982) – rapper
Billy Joel (born 1949) – singer-songwriter
David Johansen (born 1950) – actor and singer-songwriter
Scarlett Johansson (born 1984) – actress, singer, and producer
Daymond John – entrepreneur
Crockett Johnson (1906–1975) – cartoonist and children's writer (Harold and the Purple Crayon)
Boris Johnson (born 1964) – British politician, Prime Minister of the United Kingdom, and former Mayor of London (2008–2016)
Norah Jones (born 1979) – singer-songwriter and actress
 Jim Jones (born 1976) – rapper and record executive
 Julia Jones-Pugliese (1909–1993) – national champion fencer and fencing coach
Michael Jordan (born 1963) – basketball player
 Lazarus Joseph (1891–1966) – New York State Senator and New York City Comptroller
Colin Jost (born 1982) comedian, actor, and writer
William Joyce (also known as Lord Haw-Haw; 1906–1946) – Nazi propaganda broadcaster
Spike Jonze (born 1969) – actor and filmmaker

 K 

 Qurrat Ann Kadwani (born 1981) – actress and playwright
 Philip Mayer Kaiser (1913–2007) – U.S. diplomat
 Andy Kaufman (1949–1984) – comedian
 Charlie Kaufman (born 1958) – screenwriter
 Danny Kaye (1911–1987) – actor and comedian
 Lenny Kaye (born 1946) – guitarist
 Thomas Kean (born 1935) – Governor of New Jersey
 Diane Keaton (born 1946) – actress
 Harvey Keitel (born 1939) – actor
 Bridget Kelly (born 1986) – singer
 George Kennedy (1925–2016) – actor
 Jacqueline Kennedy (1929–1994) – First Lady of the United States and editor
 Max Kennedy (born 1965) – writer and lawyer
 Jerome Kern (1885–1945) – composer
 Alicia Keys (born 1981) – singer-songwriter and actress
 Robert Kibbee (1921–1982) – Chancellor of the City University of New York
 Jimmy Kimmel (born 1967) – comedian and television talk-show host
 Carole King (born 1942) – singer-songwriter
 Larry King (1933–2021) – television talk-show and radio host
 Morgana King (1930–2018) – singer and actress
 Keith Kinkaid (born 1989) – professional ice hockey player
 Nancy Kissinger (born 1934) – philanthropist
 Calvin Klein (born 1942) – fashion designer
 Diana Kleiner (born 1947) – art historian
 Christopher Knight  – actor
 John "Julius" Knight – music producer, DJ
 Miss Ko (born 1985) – rapper
 Ed Koch (1924–2013) – Mayor of New York City
 E. L. Konigsburg (1930–2013) – writer
 Peter Koo (born 1952) – politician and pharmacist 
 C. Everett Koop (1916–2013) – physician
 Yaphet Kotto (1939–2021) – actor
 Sandy Koufax (born 1935) – MLB pitcher for the Los Angeles Dodgers, perfect game pitcher
 Martin Kove – actor, known for The Karate Kid (franchise) as John Kreese in Cobra Kai Joey Kramer (born 1950) – drummer, Aerosmith
 Lenny Kravitz (born 1964) – singer-songwriter
 Barbara Kruger – feminist artist
 Stanley Kubrick (1928–1999) – film director and screenwriter
 Bruce Kulick (born 1953) – guitarist
 William Kunstler (1919–1995) – lawyer
 Tony Kushner (born 1956) – playwright and screenwriter
 Allan Kwartler (1917–1998) – sabre and foil fencer, Pan American Games and Maccabiah Games champion
 Ray Kurzweil (born 1947) – author, inventor, and futurist

 L 

Lori Loughlin (born 1964) – actress
David LaChapelle – photographer
Lady Gaga – musician and actress
Fiorello La Guardia (1882–1947) – Mayor of New York City
Jesse Lacey – musician and singer
Bert Lahr (1895–1967) – actor and comedian
Veronica Lake – actress
Jake LaMotta – boxer
Burt Lancaster (1913–1994) – actor
Martin Landau – actor
Diane Lane (born 1965) – actress
Leo Laporte – founder/host of TWiT.tv
Floria Lasky (1923–2007) – theater world lawyer
Cyndi Lauper – singer
Casey LaBow – actress
Ralph Lauren – fashion designer
Emma Lazarus – author and poet
Steve Lawrence – singer and actor
Derek Lee – baseball player
Jeanette Lee (born 1971) – professional pool player
Stan Lee (1922–2018) – comic-book writer, editor, film executive producer, actor, and publisher for Marvel Comics
Madeleine L'Engle – author
Franz Leichter (born 1930) – politician
Melissa Leo (born 1960) – actress
A. Leo Levin (1919–2015) –  law professor at the University of Pennsylvania Law School
Huey Lewis musician and singer
Joe E. Lewis (1902–1971) – comedian
Miranda Lichtenstein (born 1969) – artist
Roy Lichtenstein (1923–1997) – pop artist
Joe Lieberman – former long-time U.S. Senator from Connecticut (1989–2013); 2000 vice presidential nominee under Al Gore
Lil' Kim (Kimberly Denise Jones; born 1976) – actress and rapper
Lil Tjay (born 2001) – rapper
John Lindsay – Mayor of New York City
John Linnell – musician, one half of alternative rock duo They Might Be Giants
Liondub (Erik Weiss; born 1973) – DJ and record producer
Deborah Lipstadt  – historian and author
Peggy Lipton – actress
Lisa Lisa (born 1966) – freestyle singer; fronted Cult Jam; born Lisa Velez
John Liu (born 1967) – politician, 43rd New York City Comptroller
Lucy Liu – actress
Robert R. Livingston – U.S. founding father and diplomat
Daniel Lobell – stand-up comedian and podcaster
Tommy Lockhart – inductee into Hockey Hall of Fame, and United States Hockey Hall of Fame
Robert Loggia – actor
Lindsay Lohan – actress and singer
Tina Louise – actress
Vince Lombardi – football coach
Mike Longabardi – assistant coach for the Atlanta Hawks
Ki Longfellow – novelist
Jennifer Lopez – singer and actress
Julia Louis-Dreyfus – actress
Willie Lozado – baseball player
 Bennet Nathaniel "Nate" Lubell (1916–2006) – Olympic fencer
Edna Luby – Broadway and vaudeville performer
Lucky Luciano – gangster
Sid Luckman – football player and coach
Sidney Lumet (1924–2011) – film director, producer, and screenwriter
Frankie Lymon – singer
Carol Lynley – actress

 M 

Alice Foote MacDougall (1867–1945) – coffee wholesaler, restaurateur, and business owner in the City
 Ruth Madoff (born 1941) – wife of Bernie Madoff
Umber Majeed (born 1989) – visual artist
Lil Mama (born 1989) – rapper and actress
Bernard Malamud – author
Melissa Manchester – singer
Barry Manilow – singer-songwriter
Mike Mansfield – Senator from Montana
Bruce Manson (born 1956) – tennis player
Stephon Marbury – professional basketball player
James Margolis (born 1936) – Olympic fencer
Rose Marie (Mazetta) – actress
Romany Malco (born 1968) – actor 
John Marley (1907–1984) – actor
Dean Marlowe (born 1992) – safety for the Buffalo Bills
Constantine Maroulis – American Idol finalist
Ernest Martin – theatre director and manager
Melanie Martinez – singer-songwriter, actress, director, photographer, and screenwriter 
Soraida Martinez – artist and designer
 John Martino (born 1937) – actor
Sadie Martinot  – singer, actress
Lee Marvin – actor
Chico Marx member of the Marx Brothers
Groucho Marx member of the Marx Brothers
Gummo Marx member of the Marx Brothers
Harpo Marx member of the Marx Brothers
Zeppo Marx member of the Marx Brothers
James Maslow actor and singer (raised in California)
John Massari – composer, sound designer
Ira Brad Matetsky (born 1962) – business litigation & real estate lawyer and prominent Wikipedian
Walter Matthau – actor
Loretta Mazza (born 1957) – Sammarinese politician, Mayor of Acquaviva (2009–2013)
 Margherita Wood McCandlish (1892–1954) – American former First Lady of Guam. Born in New York City. 
John McCloskey (1810–1885) – Cardinal Archbishop of New York, 1864–1885
Frank McCourt – author (raised in Ireland, returned later in life)
Malachy McCourtauthor (raised in Ireland, returned later in life)
Allie McGuireprofessional basketball player
Triston McKenzie – MLB pitcher
Kenneth McMillan (1932–1989) – actor
Andrea Mitchell journalist, NBC News
Paul MeltsnerWPA-era painter and muralist
Bob Melvin (born 1961)Major League Baseball player and manager
Dave Meltzerpro wrestling journalist
Herman Melville (1819–1891) – author
Daniel Menaker (1941–2020) – writer and editor
Grace Meng (born 1975) – lawyer and politician, Vice Chair of the Democratic National Committee
Yehudi Menuhin (1916–1999) – violinist
Idina Menzel (born 1971) – singer and actress
Ethel Merman (1908–1984) – singer and actress
Helen Merrill – jazz singer
Jenny B. Merrill (1854–1934) – educator, author
Robert Merrill (1917–2004) – singer
Stefano Miceli (1975) – pianist and conductor
Lea Michele actress and singer
Vera Michelena (1885–1961) – actress, dancer, and singer
Alyssa Milano – actress
Sally Milgrim – fashion designer
Harvey Milk – gay activist and politician
Adeline Miller – prostitute and madam
Arthur Miller (1915–2005) – playwright
Marcus Miller – bassist and composer
Stephanie Mills singer, former Broadway star
Nicki Minaj − rapper and actress
Andy Mineo – Christian rapper
Sal Mineo (1939–1976) – actor
Lin-Manuel Miranda – musical theatre writer and performer
John Joseph Mitty – Roman Catholic Archbishop of San Francisco
Isaac Mizrahi – fashion designer
Eddie Money (1949–2019) – singer
 Lenny Montana (1926–1992) – actor and professional wrestler
Mary Tyler Moore (1936–2017) – actress, producer
Melba Moore – actress, singer
Nancie Monelle (1841–1903) – physician, missionary
Tom Morello – guitarist
Henry Morgan – radio and television personality
Huey Morgan musician, radio DJ, songwriter, television personality
 Cathy Moriarty (born 1960) – actress
Gouverneur Morris – U.S. founding father; U.S. Senator
Zero Mostel – actor, comedian
Tommy Mottola – music executive
Maria Muldaur – folk and blues singer-songwriter
John Mulholland – documentary filmmaker, film historian
Gerry Mulliganmusician
Richard Mulligan – actor
Robert Mulligandirector
Chris Mullin – basketball player
Charlie Murphy – actor, comedian
Chris Murphy – U.S. Senator from Connecticut since 2013
Eddie Murphy – actor, comedian
James Murray – comedian, actor, author
Yunus Musah – soccer player

 N 

 James M. Nack (1809–1879) – deaf and mute poet
 Dominic Napolitano (1930–1981) – Mafia caporegime
 Janet Napolitano (born 1957) – third US Secretary of Homeland Security
 Nas (born 1973) – rapper, songwriter, and entrepreneur
 Michael H. Nash (1946–2012) – labor historian, librarian, and archivist

 Casey Neistat (Born 1981) filmmaker, producer, youtuber
 [[Russell Nas

 Tonie Nathan (1923–2014) – Libertarian Party political figure
 Sarah Natochenny (born 1987) – voice actress
 Lia Neal (born 1995) – Olympic swimmer
 Oscar Neebe (1850–1916) – anarchist, labor activist, one of Haymarket bombing trial defendants
 Howard Nemerov (1920–1991) – poet
 Sylvester Nevins – politician
 Sam Newfield (1899–1964) – film director
 John Philip Newman (1826–1899) – Methodist bishop
 Denise Nickerson (1957–2019) – actress
 Harry Nilsson (1941–1994) – singer-songwriter
 Cynthia Nixon (born 1966) – actress
 Joakim Noah (born 1985) – NBA center for the New York Knicks
 Jerry Nolan (1946–1992) – rock drummer
 John Nolan (born 1978) – musician and singer
 Charles Nordhoff (1830–1901) – journalist, descriptive and miscellaneous writer
 Dagmar Nordstrom (1903–1976) – composer, pianist and singer; member of the cabaret singing duo the Nordstrom Sisters
 Siggie Nordstrom (1893–1980) – actress, model and singer; member of the cabaret singing duo the Nordstrom Sisters
 Ed Norris (born 1960) – radio host
 Chris Noth (born 1954) – actor
 Geoffrey Notkin (born 1961)  – TV science educator
 The Notorious B.I.G. (Christopher George Latore Wallace) – rapper
 Carrie Nye (1936–2006) – actress

 O 

Simon Oakland – actor
Jerry O'Connell – actor and television personality
Al Oerter (1935–2007) – four-time Olympic champion in discus throw
Kevin Ogletree – football player
Garrick Ohlsson (born 1948) – classical pianist
Keith Olbermann – television sportscaster and commentator
Jon Oliva – Savatage singer and keyboardist
Chris O'Loughlin (born 1967) – Olympic fencer
Eugene O'Neill – playwright
Paul O'Neill (1956–2017)  – music composer and producer
Robert Oppenheimer – physicist; "father of the atomic bomb"
Jerry Orbach – actor
John Ortiz – actor
Lisa Ortiz (born 1974) – actress 
Bill O'Reilly – former Fox News anchor
Adam Ottavino – MLB pitcher for the Boston Red Sox
Rick Overton – actor and comedian

 P 

P. Diddy (born 1969) – rapper, producer
Al Pacino (born 1940) – actor
Todd Phillips (born 1970) – filmmaker
Saul K. Padover (1905–1981) – historian
Alan J. Pakula (1928–1998) – film director, screenwriter, and producer
Fanny Purdy Palmer (1839–1923) – author, lecturer, activist
Joseph Papp – theater producer, impresario, founder of The Public Theater
Cheyenne Parker (born 1992) – WNBA player
Rob Parker – sportswriter, TV analyst
Lana Parrilla – actress
Joe Paterno (1928-2012) – football coach
James Patterson – novelist
Sarah Paulson – actress
Josh Peck – actor
Jan Peerce (1904–1984) – opera tenor
Amanda Peet – actress
Richard Pelham – blackface performer
Claiborne Pell – Senator from Rhode Island
Caroline Pennell – singer-songwriter, musician, and contestant on NBC's The Voice season 5
Sam Perkins – basketball player
Alan Robert Pearlman (1925–2019) – engineer, synthesizer manufacturer (ARP Instruments, Inc.)
Bernadette Peters – actress, singer
Regis Philbin (1931–2020) – actor, entertainer, television personality, and former host of ABC's Who Wants to be a Millionaire? (1999–2002) and Live! with Regis and Kelly (1983–2011)
Lip Pike – baseball player, four-time home-run champion
John Pleshette – actor
Suzanne Pleshette (1937–2008) – actress from Bob Newhart ShowEthel McClellan Plummer (1888–1936) – artist
Christopher Poole – creator of websites 4chan and Canvas Networks
Pop Smoke (1999–2020) – rapper
Ted Post – movie and TV director
Neil Postman – author, cultural critic
Chaim Potok (1929–2002) – author
Bud Powell – jazz pianist
Colin Powell – U.S. Army general and U.S. Secretary of State
Gary Powell – drummer
Joshua Prager – physician
Priscilla Presley – actress
Prince Royce – singer-songwriter, actor
Tito Puente – bandleader
Mario Puzo – author

 Q 

Q-Tip – rapper

 R 

Renee Rabinowitz (1934–2020) – psychologist and lawyer
Raekwon – rapper (Wu-tang Clan)
Bill Rafferty – comedian
Tubby Raskin (1902–1981) – basketball player and coach
Joey Ramone and Marky Ramone – punk-rock musicians
Michael Rapaport – actor, comedian, director
Ray Ratkowski – football player
Remedy (born Ross Filler in 1972) – rapper
Ray Rice – football player
Melissa Rauch – actress and comedian
Amy Ryan – actress
Lou Reed – rock musician, songwriter
A$AP Rocky – rapper
Christopher Reeve (1952–2004) – actor
Carl Reiner – comedian, actor, director, author
Rob Reiner – actor and director
Paul Reiser – actor
Charlie Reiter (born 1988) – footballer
Ed Rendell – former Mayor of Philadelphia, Governor of Pennsylvania
Brandon Reilly – musician, guitarist, singer
Leah Remini – actress
Lana Del Rey – singer and songwriter
Bebe Rexha (born 1989) – singer-songwriter
Vincent Rey – football player
Ving Rhames – actor
Charles E. Rice – legal scholar, university professor
Buddy Rich – jazz drummer
Renée Richards (born 1934) – tennis player
Terry Richardson – fashion photographer
Kadary Richmond – college basketball player for the Seton Hall Pirates
Burton Richter – Nobel Prize-winning physicist
Don Rickles – comedian
Kathleen Ridder – women's equal rights activist, writer, educator, philanthropist
Robert Ridder – Ice hockey administrator and media mogul
Joel Rifkin – serial killer
Robin Riker – actress and book author
Thelma Ritter – actress
Joan Rivers – comedian
Chris Rock – comedian and actor
Laurance Rockefeller – conservationist and philanthropist
Winthrop Rockefeller – Governor of Arkansas
Norman Rockwell – artist
Alex Rodriguez – baseball player
John Rogan – football player
Sonny Rollins – jazz saxophonist
Ray Romano – comedian and actor
Saoirse Ronan – American-born Irish actress
Igal Roodenko (1917–1991) – civil-rights activist, pacifist
Sean Rooks – basketball player and coach
Mickey Rooney – actor
Franklin Roosevelt – 32nd President of the United States
Remy Ma – rapper
Eleanor Roosevelt – U.S. First Lady and human-rights activist
Theodore Roosevelt – 26th President of the United States
Ethel Greenglass Rosenberg – convicted spy
Beatrice Rosen – actress (raised in Paris)
Jeffrey Rosen – billionaire businessman
Robert Rosen (1934–1998) – theoretical biologist 
Aaron "Rosy" Rosenberg (1912–1979) – two-time "All-American" college football player, and film and television producer 
Julius Rosenberg – convicted spy
 Nicole Ross (born 1989) – Olympic foil fencer
Emmy Rossum – actress
Veronica Roth – novelist
Mercedes Ruehl – actress
Vic Ruggiero – ska musician frontman of The Slackers
Louis Rukeyser – business columnist, economic commentator
Damien Russell – NFL player
 Gianni Russo – actor, singer, and restaurateur
Art Rust Jr. – sportscaster
David H. Rosenbloom – author
Alan Reed (1907–1977) – actor
Peter Revson (1939–1974) – race car driver

 S 

Carl Sagan – physicist and astronomer
Boris Said – NASCAR driver
J. D. Salinger – author
Jonas Salk – medical researcher
John Salley – basketball player
Jerry Saltz – art critic and art historian
Claudio Sanchez – musician
Bernie Sanders – politician, Senator from Vermont since 2007
Adam Sandler – actor, comedian
Jennifer San Marco – mass murder
Romeo Santos – singer-songwriter, actor, and record producer
Dennis Sarfate – professional baseball player
Dustin Satloff – boy entrepreneur
Francesco Scavullo – photographer
Dick Schaap – journalist
Jeremy Schaap – journalist
Vincent Schiavelli – actor and food writer
Leonard Schleifer – scientist and business executive
Julian Schnabel – artist and motion picture director
Mathieu Schneider – hockey player
Sandra Schnur – disability-rights activist
Andy Schor (born 1975) – member of the Michigan House of Representatives
Loretta Schrijver – Dutch television host
Rick Schroder – actor
Amy Schumer – actress and comedian
Chuck Schumer – Senator from New York since 1999; cousin of Amy Schumer
Julius Schwartz – comic book editor
 Catherine Scorsese (1912–1997) – actress; mother of Martin Scorsese
 Charles Scorsese (1913–1993) – actor; father of Martin Scorsese
Martin Scorsese (born 1942) – film director
Vin Scully – sportscaster
Malik Sealy – basketball player
Heriberto Seda (born 1967) – serial killer who copied The Zodiac Killer
Jon Seda – comedian
Barney Sedran (1891–1964) – Hall of Fame basketball player
Jerry Seinfeld – comedian and actor
 Julius Seligson (1909–1987) – tennis player
Edward Selzer (1893–1970) – film producer, Warner Bros.
Maurice Sendak (1928–2012) – author and illustrator
Peter Senercia (Tazz) – radio personality, color commentator and retired professional wrestler
John Serry Sr. – accordionist, organist, composer, and arranger
Saint Elizabeth Ann Seton – founder of Sisters of Charity; first native-born US citizen canonized
Cynthia Propper Seton (1926–1982) – novelist
Tupac Shakur (1971–1996)  – rapper and actor
Gene Shalit – film critic
Frank Shannon – conservative political analyst, columnist, and candidate
 Judy Shapiro-Ikenberry (born 1942) – long-distance runner
Artie Shaw (1910–2004) – bandleader
Judy Sheindlin ("Judge Judy") (born 1942) – judge and television personality
 Art Sherman (born 1937) – horse trainer and jockey
 Norm Sherry (1931–2021) – catcher, manager, and coach in Major League Baseball
Brooke Shields – actress and model
Kevin Shields – musician, member of the band My Bloody Valentine
Daniel Sickles – Civil War general
William James Sidis – mathematician, rumored to have had an IQ of 250
Bugsy Siegel – gangster
Jules Siegel – author
Maggie Siff – actress
George Silides (1922–2022) – politician and businessman, Alaska Senator
Beverly Sills (1929–2007) – opera singer
Lauren Silva – painter
Ron Silver – actor and radio show host
Robert Silverberg – author
Dean Silvers – film producer
Lindsay Sloane – actress
Alan Silvestri – film music composer
Carly Simon – singer-songwriter
Neil Simon – playwright
Richard L. Simon (1899–1960) – businessman and publisher
Kaseem Sinceno – football player
John Slidell – Senator from Louisiana and Confederate diplomat
Al Smith (1873–1944) – Governor of New York and presidential candidate
Russ Smith - former NBA player, currently plays in the Israeli Basketball Premier League
Will Smith (1981–2016) – former football player
Phoebe Snow – singer-songwriter
James McCune Smith – Abolitionist
Stephen Sondheim – musical theatre composer and lyricist
Aaron Sorkin – playwright and screenwriter
Sonia Sotomayor – United States Supreme Court Justice
Mickey Spillane – author
Eliot Spitzer – former Governor of New York
Howard Spira
Sylvester Stallone – actor, director, screenwriter
Sebastian Stan – actor
Paul Stanley – hard-rock guitarist, singer and songwriter
Barbara Stanwyck (1907–1990) – actress
Joe Start – Major League Baseball player
James Steen – football player
Jacob Steinmetz (born 2003) – baseball player
Howard Stern – radio and television host
John Stevens – delegate to Continental Congress for New Jersey
Andrew Stewart – player of gridiron football
Foley Stewart – musician
Jon Stewart – writer, producer, political satirist, actor, television personality, comedian, and former host of The Daily Show (1999–2015); born in New York City, raised in New Jersey
Julia Stiles – actress
Ben Stiller – actor and comedian
Henry L. Stimson – politician and diplomat
Oliver Stone – film director
Larry Storch – actor, comedian
 Lee Strasberg (1901–1982) – Polish-born actor, director, and theatre practitioner
Susan Strasberg – actress
Robert Strassburg – composer, conductor, musicologist
James Strauch (1921–1998) – Olympic fencer
Barbra Streisand – singer and actress
Meryl Streep – actress
 Scott Stringer (born 1960) – New York City Comptroller and Borough President of Manhattan
Jill Stuart – fashion designer
Big Sue – shopkeeper and underworld figure
Ed Sullivan (1901–1974) – television variety show host
Susan Sullivan – actress
Kevin Sussman – actor

 T 

Vic Tayback (1930–1990) – actor
Alma Tell (1898–1937) – stage and screen actress
Olive Tell (1894–1951) – stage and screen actress
Maurice Tempelsman (born 1929) – businessman
Veronica Taylor (born 1965) – actress Pokémon
Chloe Temtchine (born 1982/1983) – singer-songwriter
The Tenderloins (born 1976) – comedy troupe currently composed of Joseph "Joe" Gatto, James "Murr" Murray, Brian "Q" Quinn, and Salvatore "Sal" Vulcano
Studs Terkel (1912–2008) – author and historian
Milton Terris (1915–2002) – public health physician and epidemiologist
Roy M. Terry – Chief of Chaplains of the U.S. Air Force
Vinny Testaverde – football player
Teyana Taylor – singer-songwriter, actress, dancer, choreographer, director and model
Irving Thalberg – film producer
Leon Thomas III – actor
 Soren Thompson (born 1981)  – two-time Olympic and team World Champion épée fencer
Johnny Thunders – rock musician
Gene Tierney (1920–1991) – actress
Harry Tietlebaum (born 1889) – organized crime figure
Louis Comfort Tiffany (1848–1933) – artist
Matt Titus – professional matchmaker
James Toback (born 1944) – screenwriter and director
Isabella Tobias (born 1991) – ice dancer
Lola Todd (1904–1995) – silent film actress
Bill Todman (1916-1979) – game show producer
Michael Tolkin (born 1950) – filmmaker and novelist
Marisa Tomei (born 1964) – actress
Joe Torre – baseball player and manager
Douglas Townsend (1921–2012) – composer and musicologist
Michelle Trachtenberg – actress
Mary Travers – singer with Peter, Paul, and Mary
Payson J. Treat (1879–1972) – Japanologist
Alex Treves (1929–2020) – Italian-born American Olympic fencer 
Bernard Trink (1931–2020) – columnist
Donald Trump – 45th President of the United States, businessman
Donald Trump Jr. – businessman
Eric Trump – businessman
Fred Trump – real estate developer and philanthropist
Ivanka Trump – businesswoman
Tiffany Trump – socialite 
Barbara Tuchman (1912–1989) – historian; author
Richard Tucker (1913–1975) – opera tenor
Gene Tunney – 1926–28 heavyweight boxing champion
John V. Tunney – former U.S. Senator
John Turturro – actor and director
William Tweed (1823–1878) – politician
Liv Tyler – actress
Steven Tyler (born 1948) – singer, Aerosmith
Mike Tyson (born 1966)  – boxer
Neil deGrasse Tyson – astronomer, science communicator

 U 

Leslie Uggams – singer, actress
The Ultimate Warrior (born Jim Hellwig and also known as Warrior) professional wrestler
Louis Untermeyer (1885–1977) – poet, anthologist, critic, and editor
Hikaru Utada – singer, musician

 V 

Andrew Vachss – lawyer and author
Margaret Newton Van Cott – first woman to be licensed to preach in The Methodist Episcopal Church. 
Cy Vance – New York County District Attorney (2014 to 2022)
Cornelius Vanderbilt – businessman
Idara Victor – actress
Kia Vaughn (born 1987) – WNBA player
Robert Vaughn (1932–2016) – actor
George Vergara – NFL player
 Abe Vigoda (1921–2016) – actor
Jennifer von Mayrhauser – costume designer
CoCo Vandeweghe – tennis player

W

Michael Wachter (born 1943) – professor at the University of Pennsylvania Law School
Stanley M. Wagner (1932–2013) – rabbi and academic
Josh Waitzkin (born 1976) – chess player, martial arts competitor, and author
Christopher Walken – actor
Adam Walker – football player
Hezekiah Walker – bishop and gospel artist
Jimmy Walker (1881–1946) – Mayor of New York City
Kemba Walker – basketball player
Eli Wallach – actor
Donald A. Wallance – industrial designer
Fats Waller – jazz pianist
Rudolf Wanderone – professional pool player
Charles B. Wang (1944–2018) – businessman and philanthropist
Vera Wang – fashion designer
 Bree Warren – model
Raees Warsi – poet, journalist, and social worker
Kerry Washington – actress
Damon Wayans – actor and producer
Dwayne Wayans – director, producer, and writer
Keenen Ivory Wayans – actor, director, producer, and writer
Kim Wayans – actress
Marlon Wayans – actor and producer
Nadia Wayans – actress
Shawn Wayans – actor and producer
Michael Weatherly – actor
Sigourney Weaver – actress
Brian Wecht (born 1975) – musician, producer for Ninja Sex Party and Starbomb, and member of Game GrumpsSteven Weinberg – Nobel Prize-winning physicist
Gabriel P. Weisberg – art historian
Malina Weissman (born 2003) – child actress
Tuesday Weld – actress
 Ming-Na Wen (born 1963) – Macau-born actress and model
Tanisha Wright (born 1983) – former WNBA player and current head coach of the Atlanta Dream
Sheck Wes (born 1998) – rapper
Leslie West – rock musician
Mae West (1893–1980) – actress
Nathanael West – author
Edith Wharton – author
Joss Whedon – writer, director, producer, and composer
Maggie Wheeler – actress
Sahvir Wheeler – college basketball player for the Kentucky Wildcats
White Light Motorcade – music group
Billy Whitlock – blackface performer
Gertrude Vanderbilt Whitney – sculptor and art patron
Edward W. Whitson – Wisconsin State Assemblyman
Kristen Wiig – actress, comedian, and writer
Matthew Wilder – singer and musician 
Charles Wilkes – naval officer and explorer
Lenny Wilkens – basketball player and coach
Billy Dee Williams (born 1937) – actor
Vanessa L. Williams – singer and actress
Walter Winchell (1897–1972) – newspaper and radio gossip commentator
Harry Winitsky – political activist; founding member of the Communist Party USA
Dean Winters – actor
Mike Witteck – football player
George Worth – born György Woittitz (1915–2006), Olympic medalist saber fencer
James Hood Wright – businessman
William H. H. Wroe – member of the Wisconsin State Assembly
Jason Wu – fashion designer
Charles Wuorinen – composer
Timothy Weah – soccer player

 Y 

Izzy Yablok – football player
Tony Yayo – rapper
Burt Young – actor
Tony Young – actor 

 Z 
William Zabka – actor known for his role as Johnny Lawrence in Cobra Kai
Charlotte Zucker (1921–2007) – actress

 Non-native New Yorkers 
These people were not born or adopted in New York City and raised elsewhere but are well known for living in New York City.

 A 

William Adams – academic and clergyman; founder and president of the Union Theological Seminary in the City of New York; born in Connecticut
Samuel Adler – rabbi; born in Worms, Germany 
Lisa Ann – pornographic actress, born in Pennsylvania
Frederick Styles Agate – painter; born in England
Thomas Peter Akers – vice president of the gold board; born in Knox County, Ohio
Richard S. Aldrich – U.S. Representative from Rhode Island, practiced law in New York City
Jason Alexander – actor; born in Newark, New Jersey
Jennifer Aniston – actress; born in Sherman Oaks, California
Chester A. Arthur – U.S. president; born in Fairfield, Vermont
Isaac Asimov – author; born in Petrovichi, Russian SFSR
John Jacob Astor – first multimillionaire of U.S.; born in Germany

 B 

Lucille Ball – comedian, actress, born in Jamestown, New York
Count Basie – jazz pianist and band leader, born in Red Bank, New Jersey
William Basinski – avant-garde composter, born in Austin, Texas
Laura Joyce Bell  – contralto, wife of Digby Bell, born in London, England
Irving Berlin – composer, lyricist, born in Russia
Leonard Bernstein – conductor, born in Lawrence, Massachusetts
Lewis Black – comedian, born in Silver Spring, Maryland
Jon Blake – actor, model, born in Charlotte, North Carolina
C. L. Blood – physician
Michael Bloomberg – businessman and mayor, born in Boston, Massachusetts
Mary Booze – first African-American woman to sit on the Republican National Committee, 1924–1948; moved to New York from Mound Bayou, Mississippi
David Bowie – English musician, actor, artist, born in London, England
Marlon Brando Jr. – actor, born in Omaha, Nebraska
Brandy – singer, born in McComb, Mississippi
Lottie Briscoe – stage and silent film actress, born in St. Louis, Missouri
Tom Brokaw – television journalist, born in Webster, South Dakota
Orestes Brownson – writer, abolitionist, pro-labor reformer, Catholic apologist, born in Stockbridge, Vermont
David Byrne – musician, born in Dumbarton, Scotland

 C 

Sid Caesar – comedian and actor, born in Yonkers
Antón Cabaleiro – visual artist born in Spain
Mariah Carey – singer, born in Huntington, New York
Wendy Carlos – musician, born in Pawtucket, Rhode Island
Stokely Carmichael – political activist, born in Port of Spain, Trinidad and Tobago
Art Carney – actor, born in Mount Vernon, New York
Enrico Caruso – opera tenor, born in Naples, Italy
Willa Cather – author, born in Back Creek Valley, Virginia
Connie Chung – television journalist, born in Washington, D.C.
Madonna – singer-songwriter, actress, director, born in Bay City, Michigan
Dick Clark (1929-2012) – TV personality and producer, born in Mount Vernon, New York
Chelsea Clinton – daughter of President Bill Clinton and former Secretary of State Hillary Clinton, born in Little Rock, Arkansas
DeWitt Clinton – Senator and Governor of New York, born in Napanoch, New York
George M. Cohan – entertainer and songwriter, born in Providence, Rhode Island
J Cole – rapper, artist, born in Frankfurt, Germany
Anthony Comstock – reformer, born in New Canaan, Connecticut
Nanette Comstock  – Broadway actress, born in Albany, New York
Bill Cosby – actor and comedian, born in Philadelphia
Billy Crawford – singer, born in Manila, Philippines
Fanny Crosby – hymn writer, born in Southeast, New York
Tom Cruise – actor, born in Syracuse, New York
Bill Cullen (1920-1990) – radio host, born in Pittsburgh

 D 

Lorenzo Da Ponte – librettist to Wolfgang Amadeus Mozart and professor of Italian at Columbia University, born in Ceneda, Italy
Varina Banks Howell Davis (1826–1906) – wife of Confederate president, born in Mississippi
Sylvia Day – author, born in Los Angeles
Mike Dean – hip hop record producer, songwriter, and multi-instrumentalist, born in Houston
Mac DeMarco – singer-songwriter, born in Duncan, British Columbia, Canada
Thomas E. Dewey – Governor of New York
Vin Diesel – actor
Marlene Dietrich – actress, born in Berlin, Germany
Joe DiMaggio – baseball player, born in California
David Dinkins (1927-2020) – former Mayor of New York City, born in Trenton, New Jersey
George Washington Dixon – performer, newspaper editor 
Kevin Durant – basketball player, born in Washington D.C.
Frederick Douglass – abolitionist, born in Cordova, Maryland
Francis P. Duffy – priest, World War I chaplain to 69th New York Infantry Regiment, born in Canada
Bob Dylan – singer-songwriter, born in Duluth, Minnesota

 E 

Wilberforce Eames – bibliographer and librarian, born in Newark, New Jersey
Edward Egan – Cardinal Archbishop of New York, born in Oak Park, Illinois
Patrick Ewing – former NBA All-Star center, born in Jamaica

 F 

Lee Falk – cartoonist, born in St. Louis
Barbara Feldon – writer and retired actress
Millard Fillmore – U.S. president, born in Summerhill, New York
Bobby Fischer – chess champion, born in Chicago
Ella Fitzgerald – jazz singer, born in Newport News, Virginia
Barthold Fles – Dutch-born literary agent
Jake Flores — comedian
Steve Forbes – publisher, born in Morristown, New Jersey
Heather Foster – Jamaican-born professional bodybuilder
Felix Frankfurter – Associate Justice of the Supreme Court of the United States, born in Vienna, Austria
Henry Clay Frick – businessman, born in Westmoreland County, Pennsylvania

 G 

Dave GahanDepeche Mode singer, born in Epping, Essex, United Kingdom
Alberta Gallatin – stage and screen actress, born in Cabell County, West Virginia
Greta Garbo – actress, born in Stockholm, Sweden
Dizzy Gillespie – jazz trumpet player, born in Cheraw, South Carolina
Miguel Gómez – photographer, born in Bogotá, Colombia

 H 

Bobby Hackett – jazz musician, born in Providence, Rhode Island
Thomas S. Hamblin – actor, manager of the Bowery Theater
Alexander Hamilton – U.S. Founding Father, born in the West Indies
Townsend Harris – first U.S. diplomat in Japan, one of the founders of the City College of New York, born in Sandy Hill, New York
Mariska Hargitay (born 1964)  – actress, born in Santa Monica, California
Randy Harrison (born 1977) – actor, born in New Hampshire and formerly of Alpharetta, Georgia
Deborah Harry – singer, actress, born in Union City, New Jersey
Francis L. Hawks politician; priest, Episcopal Church; born in New Bern, North Carolina
Carlton Hayes – history professor at Columbia University, ambassador to Spain, born in Afton, New York
Ashton Hayward – former mayor of Pensacola, born in Pensacola, Florida
O. Henry – author, born in Greensboro, North Carolina
Tommy Hilfiger – fashion designer, born in Elmira, New York
Herman Hollerith – inventor, born in Buffalo, New York
Lester Holt – journalist and news anchor for the weekday edition of NBC Nightly News and Dateline NBC, born in San Francisco
Ian Hornak – realist painter, born in Philadelphia
Harry Houdini (1874–1926) – legendary illusionist and escape artist; born in Budapest, Hungary
Langston Hughes – poet, born in Joplin, Missouri

 I 
Kyrie Irving – basketball player, born in Australia, grew up in New Jersey

 J 

Janet Jackson – singer, born in Gary, Indiana
Jane Jacobs (1916–2006) – economist, urban theorist, and activist
JonTron – YouTuber, co-creator of Game Grumps, born in Rancho Palos Verdes, California
Kamara James – Olympic fencer, born in Kingston, Jamaica
Kevin James – actor, born in Mineola, New York
Peter Jennings – television journalist, born in Toronto, Ontario, Canada
Derek Jeter – baseball player, born in New Jersey
Paddy Johnson – art critic

 K 

 Gabriel Kahane – musician, born in Venice Beach, California
 Tim Keller – speaker, pastor, born in Lehigh, Pennsylvania
 Robert F. Kennedy – U.S Attorney General and U.S Senator, born in Brookline, Massachusetts
 Tom Kennedy (1927-2020) – game show host
 Jack Kerouac – writer most famously associated with the [Beat movement]
 Kiesza (full name Kiesza Rae Ellestad) – musician, dancer, and multi-instrumentalist, born in Calgary, Alberta, Canada
 Lisa Kudrow – actress, born in Encino, California
Howard Kyle – actor and founding member of Actors' Equity, born in Shullsburg, Wisconsin

 L 

Kirke La Shelle – playwright and theatrical producer, born in Wyoming, Illinois
Lachi – singer-songwriter, born in Towson, Maryland
John Layfield – professional wrestler, born in Sweetwater, Texas
Heath Ledger – Australian actor
Amy Lee – singer, born in Riverside, California
Spike Lee – film director and actor, born in Atlanta
John Lennon – Singer, Songwriter, Activist. Lennon has a memorial in New York's Central Park. The memorial is named after The Beatles song Strawberry Fields Forever.
Pierre Lorillard IV – tobacco mogul, born in Westchester, New York
Mike Lupica – journalist, author, born in Oneida, New York
Fran Lebowitz – author and public speaker, born in Morristown, New Jersey

 M 

Ralph Macchio actor, born on Long Island
Ali MacGraw – actress, born in Pound Ridge, New York
Earl Manigault – basketball player, born in Charleston, South Carolina
Mickey Mantle – baseball Hall of Famer, born in Spavinaw, Oklahoma
Dean Martin – singer and actor, born in Ohio
Ricky Martin – singer, born in Puerto Rico
Jackie Mason – comedian and actor, born in Sheboygan, Wisconsin
Jan Matulka – painter, born in Vlachovo Březí, Czech Republic
Willie Mays – baseball Hall of Famer, born in Alabama
Mike McAlary – Pulitzer Prize-winning journalist, born in Honolulu
John McCloskey – first American-born cardinal, born in Brooklyn
Rue McClanahan – theater, television, and movie actress, born in Oklahoma
Linda McCartney – photographer, wife of Beatle Paul McCartney
John McEnroe – tennis player and TV commentator, born in Germany
Zubin Mehta – orchestra conductor, born in Bombay, India
Scott Mescudi – rapper, singer, songwriter, born in Cleveland
Seth Meyers – comedian, actor, and television personality, born in Evanston, Illinois
Bette Midler – singer and actress, born in Honolulu
Liza Minnelli – actress and singer, born in Hollywood, Los Angeles
The Misshapes – DJs and party hosts
Miyawaki – Singer-songwriter musician
Moondog (born Louis Hardin) – eccentric street musician and poet, born in Kansas
Garry Moore – television show host and producer, born in Baltimore
John Pierpont Morgan – businessman, born in Hartford, Connecticut
Robert Moses – NYC urban planner and developer, born in New Haven, Connecticut
Andrew M. Murstein – taxi executive, founder of Medallion Financial

 N 

Joe Namath – professional football player, born in Beaver Falls, Pennsylvania
Thomas Nast (1840–1902) – German-born American caricaturist and editorial cartoonist; "father of the American cartoon"
Debbie Nathan - feminist journalist, born in Houston, Texas
Casey Neistat – YouTuber and entrepreneur, known for many of his projects based in New York
Colette Nelson – IFBB professional bodybuilder
Richard Nixon – former Vice President and 37th President of the United States

 O 

Soledad O'Brien – television journalist, born in Saint James, New York
John Joseph O'Connor – Roman Catholic Cardinal Archbishop of New York, born in Philadelphia, Pennsylvania
Rosie O'Donnell – actress and television personality, born on Long Island
Mary-Kate and Ashley Olsenactresses and fashion designers, born in Sherman Oaks, California
 Jacqueline Kennedy Onassis – First Lady of United States, born in Southampton, New York
Yoko Ono – artist and singer-songwriter, born in Tokyo, Japan
Haley Joel Osment – actor, born in Los Angeles
Ginny Owens – singer-songwriter, author and blogger, born in Jackson, Mississippi

 P 

Charlie Parker  – musician in jazz, considered one of the greatest musicians of all time
Sarah Jessica Parkeractress, born in Nelsonville, Ohio
George A. Parkhurst (1841–1890) – actor, witnessed Lincoln assassination (born in New York State, died in New York City)
Natalia Paruz – aka the "Saw Lady", subway musician, born in Givatayim, Israel
James Patterson  – author
Kira Peikoff – novelist and journalist
Ronald Perelman – investor, owner of Revlon, born in Greensboro, North Carolina
Itzhak Perlman (born 1945) – violinist, born in Jaffa, Israel
David Hyde Pierce – actor, born in Saratoga Springs, New York
Alban W. Purcell (c. 1843 – 1913) stage actor, born in Wadsworth, Ohio
Mihajlo Pupin (1858–1935) physicist, born in Idvor, Austrian Empire

 R 

Daniel Radcliffe – born in Fulham, London, England, United Kingdom
Johnny Ramone – born on Long Island
Ayn Rand – Russian-born novelist and philosopher
Tony Randall – actor, born in Tulsa, Oklahoma
Susan Wu Rathbone – Chinese-born community leader
Dan Rather – television news anchor, born in Wharton, Texas
Ryan Reynolds – actor; born in Vancouver, British Columbia, Canada
Raven-Symonéactress and singer; born in Atlanta
John D. Rockefeller – businessman, born in Richford, New York
Richard Rodgers – composer, born on Long Island
Andrew Rooney – CBS 60 Minutes'' commentator, born in Albany, New York
Franklin D. Roosevelt – U.S. president, born in Hyde Park, New York
Dräco Rosa – composer, singer, and actor, born on Long Island
Damon Runyon – journalist and playwright, born in Manhattan, Kansas
Babe Ruth – professional baseball player, born in Baltimore

S 

Samia – musician
Telly Savalas – actor, born on Long Island
Menachem Mendel Schneersohn – rabbi, leader of Chabad hasidic movement, born in Nikolaiv, Russian Empire
Patti Scialfa – singer-songwriter and guitarist
Amy Sedaris – actress, author, and comedian
Chloë Sevigny – actress, director, and fashion icon, born in Darien, Connecticut
Jean Shafiroff – philanthropist and socialite
Elizabeth Shepley Sergeant – journalist and writer, born in Winchester, Massachusetts
Fulton J. Sheen – Catholic bishop, author, TV show host, born in El Paso, Illinois
Abraham Shiplacoff – Jewish-American trade union organizer and left wing political activist, born in Chernihiv, Ukraine
Alana Shipp – American/Israeli IFBB professional bodybuilder
Ryan Shore – composer, songwriter, and conductor
Bobby Short – jazz musician, born in Danville, Illinois
Joel Siegel (1943-2007) – film critic, born in Los Angeles
Paul Simon – singer-songwriter, born in Newark Heights, New Jersey
Frank Sinatra – singer and actor, born in Hoboken, New Jersey
Upton Sinclair – author, born in Baltimore
Patti Smith – singer and poet, born in Chicago
Kevin Spacey  – actor, director, writer, producer, and comedian
Regina Spektor – singer-songwriter, born in Moscow, Russia
Francis Spellman – Roman Catholic Cardinal Archbishop of New York, born in Whitman, Massachusetts
Bruce Springsteen  – singer-songwriter, guitarist, and humanitarian 
Dylan Sprouse  – actor, entrepreneur, born in Arezzo, Italy
George Steinbrenner (1930-2010) – New York Yankees owner, born in Bay Village, Ohio
Wilhelm Steinitz – world chess champion, born in Prague, Czech Republic
Martha Stewart – designer and TV personality, born in Jersey City, New Jersey
Sting – musician, born in England
Shontelle
Emma Stone – actress, born in Scottsdale, Arizona
Michael Strahan – actor, television personality, and retired football player, born in Houston
Meryl Streep – actress, born in Summit, New Jersey
Peter Stuyvesant – Governor of New Netherland, born in Peperga, Netherlands
Taylor Swift – singer-songwriter

T 

Eva Tanguay (1878–1947) – vaudeville singer and comedian, born in Quebec
Nikola Tesla (1856–1943) – inventor, engineer and futurist, born in Smiljan, Austrian Empire
Samuel J. Tilden – presidential candidate, born in New Lebanon, New York
Daniel D. Tompkins – U.S. vice president, born in Westchester County, New York
Frederick Trump – German-born businessman
Melania Trump – 45th First Lady of the United States and model, born in Novo Mesto, Yugoslavia

U 
Johannes Urzidil – writer, born in Prague, Bohemia

V 

Martin Van Buren – U.S. president, born in Kinderhook, New York
Andrew VanWyngardenmember of MGMT
Gary Vaynerchuk serial entrepreneur and best-selling author
Jon Voight – actor, born in Yonkers, New York
Kurt Vonnegut (1922–2007) writer, born and raised in Indianapolis
Sal Vulcano – actor and comedian

W 

Rufus Wainwrightmusician, born in Rhinebeck, New York
John Evangelist Walsh – writer and historian, editor of the Reader's Digest Bible
Barbara Walters – TV journalist and personality, born in Boston
Dean Wareham – singer-songwriter, born in New Zealand
Andy Warhol – artist, born in Pittsburgh
Denzel Washington – actor, born in Mount Vernon, New York
Walt Whitman – poet and author, born in West Hills, New York
Olivia Wilde – actress
Barney Williams Irish-born comedian
Jayson Williams – basketball player, born in Ritter, South Carolina
Christopher Woodrow – movie producer, born in Syracuse, New York
Jason Wu – fashion designer

X 

Malcolm X (El-Hajj Malik El-Shabazz) – American Muslim, Civil human rights activist

See also 

List of people from New York
By borough:
List of people from the Bronx
List of people from Brooklyn
List of people from Manhattan
List of people from the Upper East Side
List of people from Queens
List of people from Staten Island

References 

New York City
New York City
New York City
People